Paper Houses may refer to:

Paper Houses, album by The Bollands
"Paper Houses", song by Mull Historical Society from Loss (Mull Historical Society album)
"Paper Houses", song by Bert Jansch from Toy Balloon (album)
"Paper Houses", song by Niall Horan from Flicker (album)

Paper House, a structure in Rockport, Massachusetts